Friedrich Rabod von Schele (15 September 1847-20 July 1904) was a German military officer and colonial administrator who served as governor of German East Africa from 1893 to 1895.

Biography 
Friedrich was born in Berlin to Werner Von Schele (1814-1869) and Marie Eichhorn (1822-1861). He joined the officer corps of the Prussian Army in 1865 and was commissioned as a second lieutenant. Von Schele first saw combat during the Austro-Prussian War as an officer in the cavalry. During the Franco-Prussian War, von Schele was appointed Deputy Adjutant of the 2nd Guards Cavalry Brigade, and served as an orderly officer to Prince Albert von Hohenzollern. In 1877, von Schele was promoted to Rittmeister of the 2nd Hanoverian Dragoons.

By 1891, von Schele had attained the rank of major and was appointed head of the cavalry department in the Ministry of War.

In 1892, von Schele was promoted to colonel, and was assigned commander of the Schutztruppe in German East Africa. In September 1893, Friedrich von Schele was appointed Reichskommissar of the colony, and was immediately tasked with the pacification of the Mbunga tribe, which had been fighting a rebellion against German rule since 1889. Von Schele led the Schutztruppe in an expedition along the Rufiji River in search of Mbunga chieftain Lubiki-w-mtu. During the expedition, German troops torched and looted villages and killed around 250 Mbunga. Lubiki-w-mtu was eventually captured and was hanged in front of his own subjects on December 20, 1893, after which von Schele declared that all the Mbunga were now subjects of Wilhelm II, and any further "marauding, plundering or slaving" by the Mbunga would be prohibited.

In 1894, von Schele initiated a new military campaign against the Hehe tribe and their leader, Chief Mkwawa. The Schutztruppe attacked and took Mkwawa's encampment at Kalenga on 28 October, though were unable to capture the chief, who had escaped during the attack. Nonetheless, von Schele was awarded the Pour le Mérite, the highest order of merit in the Imperial German army, on 20 November, 1894 for his successful suppression of the Hehe.

Von Schele was relieved from his post as Reichkommissar in April of 1895 and returned to Berlin, where he became an aide-de-camp to Wilhelm II. He then served as the military governor of Mainz before being discharged from the army for medical reasons in May of 1904. He died in Berlin on 20 July 1904, aged 56.

Bibliography 
 Heinrich Schnee (Hrsg.): Deutsches Kolonial-Lexikon. Band 3, Leipzig 1920, S. 262.
 Gothaisches Genealogisches Taschenbuch der Freiherrlichen Häuser. 1939. 89. Jg. Justus Perthes, Gotha 1938. Zugleich Adelsmatrikel der Deutschen Adelsgenossenschaft.
 Kurt von Priesdorff: Soldatisches Führertum. Band 10, Hanseatische Verlagsanstalt Hamburg, o. O. [Hamburg], o. J. [1942], DNB 986919810, S. 267–269, Nr. 3208.
 Karl-Friedrich Hildebrand, Christian Zweng: Die Ritter des Ordens Pour le Mérite des I. Weltkriegs. Band 3: P–Z. Biblio Verlag, Bissendorf 2011, ISBN 3-7648-2586-3, S. 195–197.

References

1847 births
1904 deaths
People from Berlin
Colonial people of German East Africa
Governors of German East Africa